Ruixin Liu (born 13 November 1998) is a Chinese professional golfer who plays on the U.S.-based LPGA Tour. She was Symetra Tour Player of the Year in 2019.

Early life and amateur career
Liu grew up in Shenzhen, about an hour from Hong Kong. She started playing golf with her family at an early age and by age nine or ten, she knew she wanted to play golf for the rest of her life. In 2011, she won the Mission Hills Jack Nicklaus Junior. 

When she was 13, her family moved to Orlando, Florida, where golf became the family's focus. She began training at the ANNIKA Academy, and in 2013, just one year after moving to Orlando, at age 14, she received an exemption into the Symetra Tour's Volvik Championship, where she made the cut. 

In 2014, she won the Suncoast Ladies Tour event at Remington Golf Club, a professional event. She was runner-up at the 2015 ANNIKA Invitational behind Angel Yin.

Professional career
Liu turned professional as an 18-year-old and joined the Symetra Tour in 2017. In her rookie season, she made 15 cuts in 18 events, with her top finish a runner-up at the Island Resort Championship. In 2018, she recorded three victories at the Island Resort Championship, IOA Golf Classic and Symetra Tour Championship. She finished first on the Symetra Tour money list to earn LPGA Tour membership for 2019.

In 2018, Liu also experienced a medical scare on the course where her heart rate spiked to 140 BPM. After extensive testing, it was determined that she is allergic to 13 different weeds and grasses commonly found on golf courses in the United States.

Liu was a rookie on the 2019 LPGA Tour where her best finish was a tie for 11th at the Marathon Classic in Ohio. 

Back on the Symetra Tour, she won the 2020 FireKeepers Casino Hotel Championship. In 2021, she won both the Carlisle Arizona Women's Golf Classic and Casino Del Sol Golf Classic. Her father caddied for her in all six of her Symetra Tour wins. She finished 5th on the money list to re-join the LPGA Tour in 2022.

Amateur wins
2011 Mission Hills Jack Nicklaus Junior
2013 China Amateur Futures Tour Leg 5

Source:

Professional wins (6)

Symetra Tour wins (6)

Other wins (1)
2014 Suncoast Ladies Tour – Remington GC (as an amateur)

Source:

Results in LPGA majors

CUT = missed the half-way cut
NT = no tournament
"T" = tied

References

External links

Chinese female golfers
LPGA Tour golfers
Sportspeople from Shenzhen
Golfers from Orlando, Florida
1998 births
Living people